The Tyson House, at 242 W. Liberty St. in Reno, Nevada, is a historic house that was built during 1904–1906 and that was once owned by the family of Nevada senator Francis Newlands.  It includes Colonial Revival elements but is primarily of Queen Anne architectural style.

The structure is primarily significant for its architecture;  the building "is an imposing and interesting vernacular example of its style in Reno, and one of the increasingly rarer representatives of this era in the City's past."  It has been modified only slightly, and "gains prominence through its corner siting."
It was listed on the National Register of Historic Places in 1983;  the listing included two contributing buildings.

References 

Houses on the National Register of Historic Places in Nevada
Queen Anne architecture in Nevada
Colonial Revival architecture in Nevada
Houses completed in 1904
National Register of Historic Places in Reno, Nevada
Houses in Reno, Nevada